Bounthong Chitmany (born 3 July 1948) is a Laotian politician and member of the Lao People's Revolutionary Party (LPRP). He is a former Governor of Oudomxay Province. He is currently Chairman of the Inspection Commission of the Lao People's Revolutionary Party. He was elected to the LPRP Central Committee at the 6th National Congress and still retains his seat. At the 10th National Congress he was elected to the LPRP Politburo, and he still retains his seat. 

He was Deputy Prime Minister from April 2016 to March 2021. He was elected Vice President of Laos in March 2021.

References

Specific

Bibliography
Books:
 

Living people
1948 births
Members of the 6th Central Committee of the Lao People's Revolutionary Party
Members of the 7th Central Committee of the Lao People's Revolutionary Party
Members of the 8th Central Committee of the Lao People's Revolutionary Party
Members of the 9th Central Committee of the Lao People's Revolutionary Party
Members of the 10th Central Committee of the Lao People's Revolutionary Party
Members of the 11th Central Committee of the Lao People's Revolutionary Party
Members of the 9th Politburo of the Lao People's Revolutionary Party
Members of the 10th Politburo of the Lao People's Revolutionary Party
Members of the 11th Politburo of the Lao People's Revolutionary Party
Members of the 8th Executive Committee of the Lao People's Revolutionary Party
Members of the 9th Secretariat of the Lao People's Revolutionary Party
Members of the 10th Secretariat of the Lao People's Revolutionary Party
Members of the 11th Secretariat of the Lao People's Revolutionary Party
Governors of Oudomxay
Deputy Prime Ministers of Laos
Government ministers of Laos
Lao People's Revolutionary Party politicians
Place of birth missing (living people)
Vice presidents of Laos